SkyHigh Mount Dandenong is a restaurant located on top of Mount Dandenong, Victoria, Australia.

Location
The current location of the restaurant was first founded as a survey point in 1861, owing to its height of 633m above sea level.

History
In the 1970s and '80s, the site was an iconic Melbourne attraction, and was well-known to most Melburnians; however, in the early 1990s the site fell into disrepair, and the building began to look aged and dilapidated. What had previously been a large tourist attraction quickly slipped from the minds of Melburnians. This culminated with the site being shut down completely in 1997.

In 2004, a new lease was negotiated with Parks Victoria, the government authority in charge of the land. The restaurant and surrounding gardens were given a $3.5 million facelift, and the site re-opened in December 2004, with the name officially being changed from "Mount Dandenong Observatory" to the current "SkyHigh Mount Dandenong".

The renovations to the site included construction of an upstairs balcony and an enlarged viewing window. Besides work on the building itself, the surrounding land was graded and landscaped, and many new plants added and the hedge maze started.

Attractions
The English Garden has grown significantly since being planted in 2005. It features meandering gravel paths and several wooden arch bridges crossing a man-made stream, constructed as part of the renovations.

The SkyHigh Maze, designed by John Connellan, opened in 2007. The maze features garden squares designed around fountains, and a trompe-l'œil.

The Giant’s Chair is a large novelty wooden chair on the front lawn of the site.

Binoculars on the viewing terrace give visitors a chance to see Melbourne in better detail. On clear days it is possible to see to Port Phillip Bay and Geelong.

The Kugel ball is a sculpture consisting of a large granite ball supported by a very thin film of water. With this installation the pump can be turned off resulting in an instant halt to the spinning sphere.

The Australiana Tree is a large gum tree. Rapidly dying after being struck by lightning in 2006, it has been carved into the shape of many native animals in a totem pole style.

Pictures

External links
SkyHigh Mount Dandenong Official Website

Tourist attractions in Melbourne
Mazes
Restaurants in Victoria (Australia)
Buildings and structures in the Shire of Yarra Ranges